Garry Bradbury (1960 – January 2022) was a British-born Australian electronic musician active in Sydney's experimental music scene from 1979 to 2022.

Career
His first significant collaboration was in 1980, along with brothers Simon and Tim Knuckey as The Wet Taxis; a band specializing in heavily treated guitar and drum machine and various tape manipulations.

In 1981, Bradbury teamed up with two other musicians, Tokyo Rose and Montgomery Smythe, to form Hiroshima Chair, another electronic outfit featuring a vast arsenal of analogue synthesizers. In 1981, they released half a split album "Reset", with Texan band Culturcide. They also released a live C60 cassette through Terse tapes.

From October 1981, Bradbury teamed up with Tom Ellard's pioneering post punk / industrial band Severed Heads . This collaboration continued sporadically from 1981 to 1985. This resulted in several albums/eps on vinyl and cassette, most notably Blubberknife (1982), Since the Accident (1983-5), City Slab Horror (1985), Goodbye Tonsils (1985) and a compilation/retrospective Clifford Darling, Please Don't live in the Past (1986). Bradbury also directed and designed, with assistance and collaborative input from numerous others, several of the early infamous Severed Heads' independently produced videos: Goodbye Tonsils, Canine and Bigcar.

He has also experimented with customized pianola scrolls.

In 1988, he completed his first solo album, Drug Induced Sex Rituals. Its release was planned, abandoned, delayed repeatedly, for several years, until it saw an eventual CDr release through Sevcom in the 1990s.

In 1997, a CD entitled Actual Size, the bulk of which consisted of Bradbury's solo material, was issued first as a double CDr through Sevcom and then as a single CD through Zonar Recordings. Much of this material resurfaced on the later compilation PANSPERMIA.

Throughout the early 2000s Bradbury was commissioned by the Sydney Theatre Company on scores for King Lear, The Tempest and Macbeth.

In the 2000s, he released two CDs, Ruffini Corpuscle in 2003 and Instant Oblivion in 2005, on the Dual Plover label.

Garry Bradbury’s 2015 compilation, PANSPERMIA, consisting of 2 lp’s and a bonus one sided 7”,is an assemblage of remastered and re-edited works recorded sporadically over a period of around 20 years from 1986 to 2005, through the German based label Vinyl On Demand. Following this PANSPERMIA PLUS (a slightly more comprehensive version) was made publicly available as a free download thru the online download service bandcamp.

In 2016, a CD of new and reworked archival material was released under the title YAKOVLEVIAN TORQUE, made available as CD and/or download through No.Ware releases operating somewhere between Berlin and San Diego.
Several of Bradbury's works also appear on the recent No-wares compilation No. No.II. (2016). A series of live performances throughout 2017 and 2018 revealed an intense, elaborately textural, less beat driven body of work which was to culminate in new releases in late 2019. Bradbury died in January 2022.

Discography

Hiroshima Chair
 Reset split LP with Culturcide — Dogfood Production System (1981)

Severed Heads

Size
 Actual Size — Zonar Recordings (1997)

Solo
 Drug Induced Sex Rituals (1988)
 Ruffini Corpuscle — Dual Plover (2003)
 "Corpuscle Plus" — Sevcom Cdr or bonus download
 Instant Oblivion — Dual Plover (2005)
 appears on "WiredLAB Open Day 2009" — Taiga Records 2011
 Panspermia (Compilation 1986-2005) 2 lp + 7" Vinyl On Demand 2015
 "Panspermia Plus"
 Yakovlevian Torque
 No. No II

References

External links 
 Bradbury
 Tumblr
 4ZZZ
 

1960 births
2022 deaths
Australian electronic musicians
English emigrants to Australia